Dichpalle is a village in Nizamabad district in the state of Telangana in India.

Leprosy centre
Dr Isabel Kerr founded the Victoria Leprosy Hospital here in 1915. In the 1960s the leprosy centre that she founded had over 400 patients.

References 

Villages in Nizamabad district